Hugh Price Hughes (8 February 1847 – 17 November 1902) was a Welsh Protestant clergyman and religious reformer in the Methodist tradition. He served in multiple leadership roles in the Wesleyan Methodist Church. He organised the West London Methodist Mission, a key Methodist organisation today. Recognised as one of the greatest orators of his era, Hughes also founded and edited an influential newspaper, the Methodist Times in 1885. His editorials helped convince Methodists to break their longstanding support for the Conservatives and support the more moralistic Liberal Party, which other Nonconformist Protestants were already supporting.

Biography 

Hughes was born in Carmarthen, and was educated at Richmond Theological College and University College London. His sister was the teacher Elizabeth Phillips Hughes. He married Katherine Hughes (née Barrett). In 1885, he founded the Methodist Times, and in 1887 he was appointed Superintendent of the West London Methodist Mission. His wife Katherine organised and led the innovative Sisters of the People, social work volunteers attached to the West London Mission. In 1896, he was elected first president of the National Council of Evangelical Free Churches, an organisation he helped create. In 1898, he was elected President of the Wesleyan Methodist Conference for a year-long term.

Hughes rose as the leader of the "Forward Movement" in Methodism, which sought to reshape the Methodist Church as the moral and social conscience of Britain. Later, he extended this idea to the Nonconformist Free Churches as a whole. He was concerned that the non-Anglican evangelical tradition had become overly focused on individual salvation, and it was time for Methodists, Baptists, Congregationalists, Presbyterians and Quakers to become churches in a fuller sense, taking on responsibility for the salvation of society. These ideas were expressed in his published sermons. In his first book of sermons, entitled Social Christianity, he declared "It is because the spirit of Christ has not been introduced into public life that Europe is in a perilous condition today... My wish is to apply Christianity to every aspect of life."

Hughes played a key role in leading Methodists into the Liberal Party coalition, away from the Conservative leanings of previous Methodist leaders. His activism embodied the concept of the "Nonconformist conscience". As a reformer, Hughes was a leader for temperance and for the repeal of the Contagious Diseases Acts. He was also a strong advocate for public, non-sectarian education and international peace. He strongly supported Gladstone's Irish Home Rule Bills. After the Irish nationalist leader Charles Stewart Parnell was revealed to have committed adultery with Katherine O'Shea, Hughes declared that English Nonconformists would no longer support the Irish cause if its leader was a proven adulterer. This threat led Gladstone to state that he could not remain as Liberal leader if Parnell continued to lead the Nationalists, thus precipitating the Parnell Split.

He died at his home in London following a stroke.

Family 
On 20 August 1873, he married Mary Katherine Howard, daughter of the Rev. Alfred Barrett, governor of Richmond Theological College; they had two sons and two daughters.

Associated Activists in Social Change 
 Emmeline Pethick-Lawrence
 Mark Guy Pearse
 Henry Simpson Lunn
 Charles Albert Berry
 Percy William Bunting
 John Greener Hallimond.

According to "A Countess at the Bowery Mission: The Christian Herald And Signs of Our Times", 20 December 1899, page 987: "Nine years ago, he [Hallimond] was connected with the great West London Mission, England, of which Rev. Hugh Price Hughes is Superintendent." This is repeated in "Great Heart of the Bowery: Leaves from the Life-Story of John G. Hallimond,late Superintendent of the Bowery Mission," Fleming H. Revell, NY: 1925. In the biographical foreword by George H. Sandison of Christian Herald, "Nine years before he came to America he was connected with the great West London Mission, of which Rev. Hugh Price Hughes was Superintendent" (page 13).

References

External links

1847 births
1902 deaths
Alumni of University College London
Methodist theologians
Presidents of the Methodist Conference
Welsh Methodists
People from Carmarthen